{{chembox
| Verifiedfields = changed
| Watchedfields = changed
| verifiedrevid = 470618137
| ImageFile = Trost ligand.png
| ImageSize = 
| ImageFile1 = Trost-ligand-from-xtal-1999-Mercury-3D-balls.png
| IUPACName = (1R,2R)-(+)-1,2-diaminocyclohexane-N,N-bis(2-diphenylphosphinobenzoyl)
| OtherNames = Trost's ligand
|Section1=
|Section2=
|Section3=
}}

The Trost ligand''' is a diphosphine used in the palladium-catalyzed Trost asymmetric allylic alkylation. Other C2-symmetric ligands derived from trans-1,2-diaminocyclohexane (DACH) have been developed, such as the (R,R'')-DACH-naphthyl ligand derived from 2-diphenylphosphino-1-naphthalenecarboxylic acid. Related bidentate phosphine-containing ligands derived from other chiral diamines and  2-diphenylphosphinobenzoic acid have also been developed for applications in asymmetric synthesis.

External links 
 Sigma-Aldrich: Trost Ligands
 Trost Research Group

Reagents for organic chemistry
Catalysts
Tertiary phosphines
Benzamides